Lahav 433 is an Israeli crime-fighting umbrella organization within the Israel Police, created on January 1, 2008. Known as the "Israeli FBI", the unit is the merger of five law enforcement offices into one. It was established as an initiative of then-Minister for Public Security, Avi Dichter, and the Head of Police's Investigations Branch, Yohanan Danino.

It is tasked with investigating national crimes and corruption. It also investigates crimes such as murder and sexual assault.

The number four is for the four region departments that form the unit while the number 33 is for The Gideonites, a Mista'arvim unit. The Unit's Headquarters is located in the North Industrial Zone of Lod. The current chief commander is Yigal Ben Shalom, since March 2018.

Structure
 National Cyber Crime Unit
 Child Online Protection Bureau - Fights Cybercrimes done against minors. Also operates a hotline with the phone number 105, which receives reports about Cybercrimes against minors from the public.
 National Fraud Investigations Unit (Yaha)
 Unit of International Crime Investigations (Yahbal)
 National Financial Investigations Unit (Yalak)
 National Unit for Locating Stolen Vehicles (Etgar)
 National Unit for Prisons Guards' Investigations (Yahs)
 The Gideonites – Mista'arvim unit

Commanders

References

External links
mops.gov.il

Police units of Israel